Leuconostoc carnosum is a lactic acid bacterium; its type strain is NCFB 2776. Its genome has been sequenced. Its name derives from the fact that it was first isolated from chill-stored meats. Its significance is that it thrives in anaerobic environments with a temperature around 2 °C, thus has been known to spoil vacuum-packed meat, yet it is not pathogenic and certain strains of L. carnosum are known to produce bactericides known to inhibit or kill Listeria monocytogenes.

References

Further reading

Björkroth, K. J., Peter Vandamme, and H. J. Korkeala. "Identification and Characterization ofLeuconostoc carnosum, Associated with Production and Spoilage of Vacuum-Packaged, Sliced, Cooked Ham." Applied and Environmental Microbiology 64.9 (1998): 3313–3319.

External links
LPSN

Type strain of Leuconostoc carnosum at BacDive -  the Bacterial Diversity Metadatabase

Lactobacillaceae
Bacteria described in 1989